The Dunwich Horror and Others is a collection of fantasy, horror and science fiction short stories by American author H. P. Lovecraft. It was originally published in 1963 by Arkham House in an edition of 3,133 copies.

The true first edition is not bound with head- and tailbands, and the true first-state dustjacket carries a price of $5.00 (not $6.50 as on later printings). (Reportedly some copies lack head and tailbands, indicating the true first edition, but bear the $6.50 price on the dustjacket, suggesting that the publisher ran out of first-edition dustjackets before they ran out of first-edition books, so they raised the price to $6.50, sold the remaining first-edition volumes in second-state jackets, and then started reprinting the book).

The collection was revised in 1985 by S.T. Joshi, replacing the introduction by August Derleth for one by Joshi and another by Robert Bloch.  This edition, designated a "corrected sixth printing", was published in an edition of 4,124 copies.

Contents

The Dunwich Horror and Others contains the following tales:

 H. P. Lovecraft and His Work by August Derleth
 In the Vault
 Pickman's Model
 The Rats in the Walls
 The Outsider
 The Colour out of Space
 The Music of Erich Zann
 The Haunter of the Dark
 The Picture in the House
 The Call of Cthulhu
 The Dunwich Horror
 Cool Air
 The Whisperer in Darkness
 The Terrible Old Man
 The Thing on the Doorstep
 The Shadow Over Innsmouth
 The Shadow Out of Time

Reprints
2nd printing, 1966 - 2,090 copies.
3rd printing, 1970 - 4,050 copies.
4th printing, 1974 - 4,978 copies.
5th printing, 1981 - 3,084 copies.
corrected 6th printing, 1985 - 4,124 copies.
corrected 7th printing, 1985 - 3,675 copies.
corrected 8th printing, 1988 - 4,783 copies.
corrected 9th printing, 1992 - 4,973 copies.
corrected 10th printing, 1997 - 2,945 copies.
corrected 11th printing, 2000 - 2,500 copies.

References

1963 short story collections
Short story collections by H. P. Lovecraft
Cthulhu Mythos anthologies
Arkham House books